Dave Beran is an American chef.

Early life and education
Beran was born in Ashland, Wisconsin, and graduated from Lake Forest College in 2003.

Career
Beran was the executive chef at Next, which is co-owned by Grant Achatz and Nick Kokonas.  He announced his departure from Next Restaurant on April 14, 2016, citing his desires to start his own restaurant in Los Angeles. He owned and operated two restaurants in the Santa Monica neighborhood of Los Angeles: Dialogue, now permanently closed (one michelin star), and Pasjoli (one michelin star).

Awards
Under Dave Beran's oversight, Next received the James Beard award for Best New Restaurant in 2012.

After being nominated three times in the three years prior, for best new chef and for rising star chef, in 2014, Beran won the James Beard Foundation award for Best Chef: Great Lakes.

Also in 2014, Beran, along with 10 other chefs from around the country, was included in the Food & Wine class of best new chefs.

Personal life
Beran lives in Los Angeles with his wife, Jamie Schneiter, and two French Bulldogs. Beran is an avid marathon runner and has been known to run the Chicago Marathon and show up to work a full day afterwards.

References

External links
Dave Beran on www.foodandwine.com

American male chefs
American chefs
Lake Forest College alumni
Living people
James Beard Foundation Award winners
Year of birth missing (living people)
People from Ashland, Wisconsin